The James A. Ramage Civil War Museum sought to tell the untold story of Cincinnati, Ohio, and Northern Kentucky's involvement in the American Civil War. Although no battles occurred there, the people of the area resisted a push by the Confederate army in 1862. The museum was located on the site of Hooper Battery. The museum grounds covered  and it displayed historical passages, stories, and memorabilia. It also paid homage to the Black Brigade of Cincinnati, Fern Storer's kitchen, and the history of the city of Fort Wright.

On August 25, 2021, Fort Wright's mayor, Dave Hatter, ordered the museum closed, following a year of negotiations with the museum's board to correct various infrastructure and program problems. Battery Hooper Park, where the museum is located, remains open to the public.

History
The city of Fort Wright, Kentucky, was approached by the Northern Kentucky University Foundation in 2004 to acquire the property. The property had been willed to the foundation by owners Fern and Sheldon Storer and is located on top of a hill that had historical significance as one of the artillery batteries and trenches that helped defend Cincinnati, from approximately 8,000 Confederate soldiers under Maj. Gen. Henry Heth in September 1862. Though Kentucky permitted slavery, fewer slaves were in Kenton County than many other Kentucky counties, and during the Civil War General Ulysses S. Grant's own parents—not slave owners—lived just a few miles from the site.

Local men from all walks of life and ethnicities, plus some soldiers worked together to erect a defensive line over eight miles in length (13 km) from Ludlow to present-day Fort Thomas to defend against the Confederate invasion of Kentucky. Men dug rifle pits, erected forts, and cut trees for a clear field of fire using tree limbs as barriers against infantry. Confederate soldiers marched to within a few miles of Fort Mitchel, known today as Fort Mitchell, observed for two days, and decided that the defenses, manned by approximately 25,000 Union troops and 60,000 local militia, were too strong. The Confederate invaders withdrew to Lexington on September 12 after a skirmish on September 10 and 11 near Fort Mitchel.

The property, and more specifically the two-story house that sits on it, is also significant because it was the home of Fern Storer. Storer was a well-known food editor for the now defunct Cincinnati Post from 1951 to 1976. "She was meticulous about testing recipes," said [former] Cincinnati Post home/food editor Joyce Rosencrans. "She took great pride in the accuracy of those food sections and passed those principles down to me."

The museum
Rather than sell the lucrative hilltop site to developers, the NKU Foundation sold the property to the city of Fort Wright for $790,000. City officials, in turn, announced plans to turn the historic site into a passive park focusing on the area's Civil War heritage. The land is where Hooper Battery was located and is one of only six extant Civil War fortifications in Northern Kentucky. The City of Fort Wright was responsible for the Hooper Battery archaeological site including public archaeology excavations and any future restoration with a $32,000 grant from the Scripps Howard Foundation Center for Civic Engagement.

In May 2004, Fort Wright Administrator Larry Klein said this of the grant, "This will be a great start to a great park. The few batteries that do exist aren't very accessible. There will be no place else like this in Greater Cincinnati that'll be preserved and open for public use."  Today, only six batteries remain - four in Kenton County and two in Campbell County.

The museum's namesake, James A. Ramage, is a retired history professor from Northern Kentucky University. He received numerous awards at NKU, including Outstanding Professor of the Year (1988), Outstanding Faculty Advisor Award (1999), and Acorn Award from Kentucky Advocates for Higher Education (2003), among others.  At the Phi Alpha Theta national convention in Philadelphia, January 4–6, 2006, he was elected national vice president (2006-2007) and president elect (2008-2009).

In 2004 Ramage received a University-Community Partnership Grant through NKU's Scripps Howard Center for Civil Engagement for the Battery Hooper Project. The goal was to partner with the City of Fort Wright in involving students and the public in preserving, researching, and opening Hooper Battery to the public. City Administrator Larry Klein represented the city and NKU Adjunct Professor Jeannine Kreinbrink was Archaeology Project Manager. On June 30, 2005, the project culminated with the opening of a museum on the site. Mayor Gene Weaver and the City Council named the museum in honor of Ramage's work. As of September 1, 2006, over 5,000 people had visited the James A. Ramage Civil War Museum.  On December 9, 2007, Douglas Vonderhaar was honored as the museum's 10,000th visitor. In 2021 the museum founded the Kentucky Underground Railroad Freedom Trail which connects historic sites and museums across the Commonwealth of Kentucky that tell the story of the struggle from bondage to freedom and the new life afterward. The Ramage Museum featured exhibits on the tragic story of Margaret Garner who was enslaved in Boone County but escaped by crossing the frozen Ohio River with her family, fought recapture, and attempted to kill her children rather than having them return to a slavery. Other exhibits focused on African American heritage, including the first American American military unit "The Cincinnati Black Brigade" including Congressional Medal of Honor awarded Powhatan Beaty and other African American's who were awarded the Medal of Honor for their Civil War service. Underground Railroad conductor Harriet Tubman and Major General Lew Wallace who in 1864 founded the first Freedman Bureau. Several exhibits highlighted the struggle for the women's right to vote and women with significant involvement with the Civil War.

The Black Brigade of Cincinnati

After the declaration of martial law on September 2, 1862, Cincinnati Mayor George Hatch ordered the police department to gather any and all able-bodied African American males for work on fatigue duty on the fortifications in Northern Kentucky. Men were driven from their homes and businesses by bayonet point to a mule pen on Plum Street in Cincinnati. After hours of solitude, the men were taken as a group across the Ohio River to begin work on the earthwork fortifications. This group became known as the Black Brigade of Cincinnati. When Union Major General Lew Wallace learned about the poor treatment of the men, he commissioned Judge William Martin Dickson as commander of the Black Brigade on September 4, 1862.

After receiving his appointment, Colonel Dickson changed the brigade into a working regiment of three battalions. On the evening of September 4, 1862, Dickson dismissed the men to tend to their families as well as gather personal supplies for the days of work ahead. He promised them that he was forming the brigade for fatigue duty and they "should be kept together as a distinct body,... that they should receive protection and the same treatment as white men,... and that their sense of duty and honor would cause them to obey all orders given, and thus prevent the necessity of any compulsion...".  In return for these promises, Dickson expected the men to meet the next morning for work on the defensive fortifications. In his official report to Ohio Governor John Brough on January 12, 1864, Dickson stated that around 400 men were present when he dismissed the Black Brigade on September 4, 1862. The next day over 700 men reported ready for duty. The Black Brigade continued their service for a number of weeks.

Events
Although the museum was an entity of the City of Fort Wright, it accepted donations in order to remain operational and hosted a variety of events. One of the most significant was the archaeological excavations of Hooper Battery. Because the battery site was filled in with dirt, it was preserved quite well. This provided an opportunity for the public to take part in archaeological activities.

See also
 Cincinnati in the American Civil War
 Defense of Cincinnati
 Hooper Battery
 Kentucky in the American Civil War

References

External links
 James A. Ramage Civil War Museum official site

Museums established in 2005
Museums disestablished in 2021
Kentucky in the American Civil War
Defunct museums in the United States
American Civil War forts
2005 establishments in Kentucky
2021 disestablishments in Kentucky